Derek Boosey (born 15 July 1942) is a British athlete. He competed in the men's triple jump at the 1968 Summer Olympics.

References

1942 births
Living people
Athletes (track and field) at the 1968 Summer Olympics
British male triple jumpers
Olympic athletes of Great Britain
Place of birth missing (living people)